Fighter Squadron 194 or VF-194 was a short-lived aviation unit of the United States Navy established on 18 May 1955 and disestablished on 10 April 1958. It was the second US Navy squadron to be designated VF-194.

Operational history
 
After the end of this deployment VF-194 and ATG-3 were disestablished on 10 April 1958.

Home port assignments
NAS Moffett Field

Aircraft assignment
F2H-3 Banshee

See also
History of the United States Navy
List of inactive United States Navy aircraft squadrons
List of United States Navy aircraft squadrons

References

External links

Strike fighter squadrons of the United States Navy